The World Junior Alpine Skiing Championships 2019 were the 38th World Junior Alpine Skiing Championships, held between 18 and 27 February 2019 in Val di Fassa, Trentino, Italy.

Race courses took place at the Aloch Ski Stadium in Pozza di Fassa (Sèn Jan di Fassa) and at La VolatA slope on Passo San Pellegrino (Moena).

Schedule

Eleven events will be held.

Medal winners

Men's events

Ladies events

Team event

Medal table

References

External links
Official website

World Junior Alpine Skiing Championships
2019 in alpine skiing
Alpine skiing competitions in Italy
2019 in Italian sport
Alpine skiing
February 2019 sports events in Italy